Neil Andrew Jacobs, Jr. (born December 12, 1973) is an American scientist and former government official who served as the acting Under Secretary of Commerce for Oceans and Atmosphere and Administrator of the National Oceanic and Atmospheric Administration.

Early life and education 
Jacobs was born in Colorado Springs, Colorado. He earned two Bachelor of Science degrees, in mathematics and physics, from the University of South Carolina in 1997, followed by a Master of Science and PhD in atmospheric science from North Carolina State University.

Career

Industry
After completing his doctoral degree in 2005, Jacobs went to work with North Carolina-based AirDat LLC to work on the development of their TAMDAR (Tropospheric Airborne Meteorological Data Reporting) weather monitoring system as their director of research and business development. He stayed on with the company when the company was acquired by Panasonic Avionics Corporation in 2013. At Panasonic, he served as chief atmospheric scientist from 2013 until he was asked by President Trump to join the government in 2018.

During his time at AiRDat and Panasonic, Jacobs also worked on a small team of atmospheric scientists at World Meteorological Organization and served as chair of the American Meteorological Society's Forecast Improvement Group.

Government
In 2017, Jacobs was nominated to serve as Assistant Secretary of Commerce for Environmental Observation and Prediction and was confirmed on February 15, 2018. When Timothy Gallaudet, the acting NOAA Administrator asked to be allowed to focus on his Senate-confirmed position as Assistant Secretary of Commerce for Oceans and Atmosphere in February 2018, Jacobs became the Acting NOAA Administrator and late the next year he was nominated to take on the role permanently when Barry Myers withdrew from consideration for health reason. After not being confirmed in 2019, he was re-nominated in 2020. A hearing on his nomination was held in March 2020 and his nomination was approved by the Senate Commerce Committee in May of that year. On January 3, 2021, his nomination was returned to the President under Rule XXXI, Paragraph 6 of the United States Senate.

Role in Sharpiegate 

In September 2019, President Donald Trump claimed that Hurricane Dorian would make landfall over Alabama. After receiving several inquiries from residents, the National Oceanic and Atmospheric Administration released a statement that Dorian would not reach Alabama. In an Oval Office briefing with reporters, Trump displayed a map including the altered projection that Dorian would make landfall in Alabama. On September 6, the NOAA released a statement in support of Trump's claim, including Alabama in the list of states that Dorian was expected to reach. In June 2020, an internal investigation found that Jacobs had violated the NOAA's code of ethics by issuing a statement in support of Trump's claim, in addition to criticizing employees at the National Weather Service office in Birmingham, Alabama for correcting Trump.

Personal life 
Jacobs lives in Durham, North Carolina with his wife and two children. Jacobs is an avid surfer in the Outer Banks region.

References 

American atmospheric scientists
University of South Carolina alumni
North Carolina State University alumni
Trump administration personnel
United States Under Secretaries of Commerce
1973 births
Living people